Pablo y Elena is a Mexican telenovela produced by Televisa for Telesistema Mexicano in 1963.

Cast 
Tony Carbajal as Pablo
Patricia Morán as Elena
Pilar Sen
Francisco Jambrina
María Eugenia Ríos
Raúl Farell

References

External links 

Mexican telenovelas
1963 telenovelas
Televisa telenovelas
1963 Mexican television series debuts
1963 Mexican television series endings
Spanish-language telenovelas